Akhmour is a sub-district located in the Al-Mawasit District, Taiz Governorate, Yemen. Akhmour had a population of 6,553 according to the 2004 census.

Villages
 Akhmour Dakhal
 Akhmour Kharij

References

Sub-districts in Al-Mawasit District